Carter Glass House is a historic house at 605 Clay Street in Lynchburg, Virginia.  Built in 1827, it is nationally significant as the longtime home of United States Congressman, Senator, and Treasury Secretary Carter Glass (1858-1946), who championed creation of the Federal Reserve System and passage of the Glass-Steagall Act, which constrained banking activities.  The house was designated a National Historic Landmark in 1976.  It now serves as a parish hall for the adjacent St. Paul's Church.

Description and history
The Carter Glass House is located in Lynchburg's Court House Hill area, on the west side of Clay Street south of 6th Street.  It shares the block with St. Paul's Church, from which it is separated by a broad lawn.  It is a -story, almost square, red brick dwelling. It sits on a raised basement and has a shallow slate covered hipped roof. The front facade features a one-bay wide, wood-floored, Ionic order portico supported by four columns and two pilasters.

The house was built in 1827 by John Mill, a local lawyer and architect.  In 1853 it passed to his daughter and son-in-law, George Dixon Davis.  In 1907 it was purchased by Carter Glass, who made the house is primary residence until 1923, and owned it until his death in 1946.  It was acquired by the church in 1960.  Glass was responsible for modernizing the house's systems and adding dormers to its roof; there have been only modest changes since his ownership.

Carter Glass was a major political figure in the fundamental development of the United States' financial systems.  As a Congressman, he chaired the House Committee on Banking and Currency, co-sponsoring the Glass-Owen Bill which in 1913 established the Federal Reserve System.  In 1920 he was elected to the Senate, where he sponsored the Glass-Steagall Act of 1933, which required separation between investment and commercial banking.  During the 1930s he was a leading critic and opponent of President Franklin Delano Roosevelt's New Deal reforms.

See also
List of National Historic Landmarks in Virginia
National Register of Historic Places listings in Lynchburg, Virginia

References

External links

Historic American Buildings Survey (HABS) No. VA-1105, "Wills-Davis-Glass House, Clay & Sixth Streets, Lynchburg, VA," 2 photos

National Historic Landmarks in Virginia
Historic American Buildings Survey in Virginia
Houses on the National Register of Historic Places in Virginia
Houses completed in 1827
Colonial Revival architecture in Virginia
Houses in Lynchburg, Virginia
National Register of Historic Places in Lynchburg, Virginia
Individually listed contributing properties to historic districts on the National Register in Virginia
1827 establishments in Virginia